Thalassobathia pelagica is a species of fish in the family Bythitidae (viviparous brotulas). It is sometimes referred to by the common name pelagic brotula.

Description
It has 72–79 dorsal soft rays, 58–65 anal soft rays and 22–29 pectoral soft rays. It has 7 branchiostegal rays and its head and body are compressed.

Habitat
Two specimens have been collected between Iceland and Ireland, and one from the Gulf of Guinea. It has also been reported from Greenland and Iceland. A specimen from the Bering Sea has uncertain identification as this species.

Behaviour
Thalassobathia pelagica lives in close association with the sea jelly Stygiomedusa gigantea.

References

 

Bythitidae
Fish described in 1963
Taxa named by Daniel Morris Cohen